Pro Championship Wrestling (PCW UK) is a British owned independent professional wrestling promotion established as Preston City Wrestling in 2011. It was re-branded as Pro Championship Wrestling in 2020, and is still stylised as PCW. PCW runs the majority of its shows in Preston, in the county of Lancashire in England.

History 
Pro Championship Wrestling UK was founded in 2011 as Preston City Wrestling by Steven Fludder in Preston, Lancashire. Their first event was held on 26 August 2011 in Preston and they crowned their first PCW champion during the second show on 23 September. Many other notable British talents have also wrestled at PCW including Magnus, Drew Galloway and Doug Williams. In 2013, it was announced that former boxing champion Riddick Bowe would sign his first contract with PCW and wrestle his first match in March 2014. However, on 14 December 2013, Preston City Wrestling announced on their Facebook Page that Bowe would no longer be appearing due to a disagreement with Bowe`s new agent. At "Tribute to the Troops" in 2014, approximately 2000 people were in attendance for the free (non paid) show, a record for a wrestling show in the United Kingdom outside of WWE or WCW shows. In June 2014 they announced their partnership with Ring of Honor (ROH) and presented their first show together called "Supershow of Honor" in November. In July 2015 it was announced that another four wrestling shows co-promoted by both organizations would occur in November 2015. On 27 November Adam Cole became the first Ring of Honor wrestler to gain a PCW title, winning the PCW Cruiserweight Championship from El Ligero. It was announced on Twitter that Billy Gunn signed with PCW for "Road To Glory 2016" show in February along with Tajiri. On 25 June 2016, PCW hosted the first HD iPPV in European wrestling history. In September 2016, PCW withdrew from its relationship with ROH and announced they were now working with American promotions Beyond Wrestling and Combat Zone Wrestling (CZW) and German promotion Westside Xtreme Wrestling (wXw).

Championships

Current champions

Tournaments

Road To Glory winners
2013: Noam Dar
2014: Chris Masters
2015: Bubblegum
2016: Rampage Brown
2018: Dean Allmark
2019: Joey Hayes

PCW Heavyweight Championship
The PCW Heavyweight Championship is a professional wrestling championship owned by the Preston City Wrestling (PCW) promotion. The title was created and debuted on 23 September 2011.

The current champion is Joey Hayes, who is in his second reign.

Combined reigns

PCW Tag Team Championship
The PCW Tag Team Championship is a professional wrestling Championship (professional wrestling) owned by the Preston City Wrestling (PCW) promotion. The title was created and debuted on 17 August 2012.

The current champions are The Buy Out (Bram, Danny Hope and Sheikh El Sham), who are in their second reign.

Combined reigns 

{| class="wikitable sortable" style="text-align: center"
!Rank
!Team
!No. ofreigns
!Combineddays
|-
!1
|Team Single || 2 || 1,268
|-
!2
| Fight Club || 1 || 287
|-
!3
| UK Hooligans || 1 || 258
|-
!4
|style="background-color: #ffe6bd"| The Buy Out† || 1 || +
|-
!5
|  || 1 || 238
|-
!6
|  || 1 || 182
|-
!7
| Martin Kirby and Joey Hayes || 1 || 155
|-
!8
|  || 1 || 35
|-
!9
|  || 1 || 20
|-
!10
|  || 1 || 1
|-
!11
| Joey Hayes and Iestyn Rees || 1 || <1
|-

PCW Cruiserweight Championship
The PCW Cruiserweight Championship is a professional wrestling championship owned by the Preston City Wrestling (PCW) promotion. The title debuted on 17 August 2012.

The current champion is Dave Birch, who is in his first reign.

PCW Women's Championship

The PCW Women's Championship is a professional wrestling championship owned by the Preston City Wrestling (PCW) promotion. The title was first awarded on 26 August 2017 when Lucy Cole defeated Lauren, Nightshade, Rhio, Sammii Jayne, and Sierra Loxton in a six-way elimination match at Girl Power 2.

The current champion is Lizzy Styles, who is in her first reign

{| class="wikitable sortable"
|-
! #
!Wrestlers
!Reign
!Date
!Daysheld
!Location
!Event
!Notes
|-
|
|
|
|
|
| 
|
|align="left"|Cole defeated Lauren, Nightshade, Rhio, Sammii Jayne, and Sierra Loxton in a six-way elimination match to become the inaugural champion.
|-
|—
|Vacated
|—
|
|—
| 
|
|align="left"|Vacated due to injury. 
|-
|
|
|
|
|
| 
|
|align="left"|Rhio defeated Nightshade to win the vacant title.
|-
|
|
|
|
|
| 
|
|align="left"|
|-
|
|
|
|
|
| 
|
|align="left"|This was a Triple Threat match also including Nightshade.
|-
|
|
|
|
|
| 
|
|align="left"|This was a Ladder match.
|-
|
|
|
|
|+
| 
|

References

External links
 Preston City Wrestling official website

British professional wrestling promotions
Sport in Preston